James Thomas may refer to:

Politicians
 James Thomas (Australian politician) (1826–1884), civil engineer who was Director of Public Works in Western Australia, 1876–1884
 James Thomas (Governor of Maryland) (1785–1845), served as the 23rd Governor of the state of Maryland
 James Thomas (Swansea) (1710–1781), Alderman and Portreeve of Swansea
 James Thomas, 1st Viscount Cilcennin (1903–1960), Conservative politician in the UK, and former First Lord of the Admiralty
 James C. Thomas (1889–1958), New York assemblyman
 J. H. Thomas (James Henry Thomas, 1874–1949), British trade unionist and Labour politician
 James Houston Thomas (1808–1876), US Congressman from Tennessee
 James John Thomas (1868–1947), mayor of Columbus, Ohio
 James S. Thomas (mayor) (1802–1874), mayor of St. Louis

Musicians
 James Thomas (English musician) (born 1963), director of music of St Edmundsbury Cathedral
 James Thomas (blues musician) (1926–1993), American Delta blues musician

Sportsmen
 James Thomas (basketball) (born 1980), American basketball player
 James Thomas (footballer, born 1979), Welsh footballer
 James Thomas (footballer, born 1997), English footballer
 James Thomas (rugby union) (born 1990), Welsh rugby union player
 James T. Thomas (1938–2015), head college football coach for the Mississippi Valley State University Delta Devils

Others
 James Burrows Thomas (born 1935), Australian judge
 James Samuel Thomas (1919–2010), Bishop of the United Methodist Church
 J. T. Thomas (Survivor contestant) (born 1984), winner of Survivor: Tocantins
 James Thomas (professor), professor at the University of Utah
 James Thomas (priest), Dean of Saint Paul's Cathedral, Wellington
 James Kay Thomas (1902–1989), West Virginia Attorney General
 James Havard Thomas (1854–1921), Welsh sculptor
 James Francis Thomas (1861–1942), solicitor from Tenterfield, New South Wales

See also
 Jimmy Thomas (American football) (1947–2017), former National Football League running back
 Jim Thomas (disambiguation)
 Jamie Thomas (disambiguation)